Makario Stadium,  is an all-seater multi-purpose stadium in Nicosia, Cyprus. It was the largest and main sports venue of the capital up to the construction of the GSP stadium in 1999. At present it is mostly used for football matches and is the home ground of Digenis Morphou, and Ethnikos Assia. The stadium holds 15,590 seated spectators. The playing field is surrounded by a running track and can be adapted to hold most track and field events. Apart from corporate boxes and the press centre, there are no coverings for spectators. 

It is built in the Nicosia suburb of Makedonitissa, close to the grounds of the Cyprus State Fair, with which it shares a large car park.

Over the years it has served as the home ground for Nicosia teams such as AC Omonia, APOEL and Olympiakos. The Cypriot national team has also played home matches there in the past. All those teams have now relocated to the New GSP stadium. The ultras of APOEL (PANSYFI - AU79) and Omonia (Gate-9) were formed during the years their teams played at the stadium.

The Makario was built in 1978 and is named after Makarios III, the Ethnarch of Cyprus; Archbishop and first President of Cyprus. It has hosted many Cypriot Cup and Super Cup finals and was the main venue for the 1989 Games of the Small States of Europe.

The record of the highest attendance for a European Competition game is over than 30,000 spectators in the match between OMONOIA and ANDERLECHT for the 1985-86 UEFA Champions League last-16omonoia-vs-anderlecht/ . The match was held on Wednesday, 6 Nov 1985 • 20:00 and ended with a 1–3 win for ANDERLECHT .

Publications of the time state that there were 34,000 spectators at the Makarios stadium, which is a record number of fans in Cypriot stadiums.

References

Athletics (track and field) venues in Cyprus
Sport in Nicosia
Football venues in Cyprus
Multi-purpose stadiums in Cyprus
Buildings and structures in Nicosia
Sports venues in Cyprus
Doxa Katokopias FC